Altona East Phoenix Soccer Club (PAOK) is an Australian soccer club based in the western suburbs of Melbourne, Victoria, Australia, currently in the Victorian State League Division 2 North-West. They play at the Paisley Park Soccer Complex in Altona North.

History
They were founded in 1979 by local Greek Australians under the name East Altona PAOK Soccer Club, taking their nickname and black and white stripes from the famous Greek club of the same name. The PAOK name was changed to Altona East Phoenix Soccer Club in the 1990s in accordance with Australian soccer authorities racist policy at mainstreaming soccer in Australia by forcing all teams to remove non-Anglo references in names.

They spent most of their history up until 1992 in the amateur and provisional leagues, before steadily progressing up the league system and forming a close tight-knit squad that provided the results to eventually reach the Victorian Premier League (VPL) in 1999. After a hard-fought first inaugural season Altona East stayed up, which were followed by fantastic seasons in 2000 (3rd), 2001 (Semi-Finals) and 2002 (Elimination Finals). The club's reign as a title contender would end in 2003 as the club saw three different coaches unsuccessfully pull Phoenix out of relegation.

Following the club's first ever relegation, Altona East maintained a solid mid-table finish in the 2004 State League 1 Division. The 2005 season saw a hard-fought campaign to push back into the VPL, finishing third, just outside a promotion place. 2006 saw another woeful season and Phoenix were relegated back into Division 2.

The 2007 season saw a new batch of youngsters as well as some key experienced players, guided under new coach and ex-VPL referee Dominic Barba, as Altona East attempted to begin a new and improved squad. After an opening day 4–0 victory, PAOK saw itself with one victory in its first 9 games. However, the team recruited well mid-season and finished the season off positively, smashing rivals Altona City and Williamstown 6–1 and 7–1 respectively along the way.

The 2008 season saw the club with the determination of promotion back to State League 1, containing a large and very strong squad. Being in the top two positions for most of the season, the Phoenix dropped crucial points and their fate was ultimately realised with a 2–1 away loss to eventual premiers Pascoe Vale, with the club finishing in 4th. However tragedy struck Paisley Park a day after the team's 2–1 home win against Cairnlea, with the news that then-current striker Nazir Ismail had died due to a car accident in the night. Nazir also scored in the match the day before, having a tally of 4 goals in his 7-game stint with the club.

Altona East began the 2009 season with a weaker  list than the previous year, but started brightly winning 5 games out of their first 6. However, after a run of mixed results, coach Dominic Barba was dismissed and within the week the experienced Zoran Trajcevski was appointed to salvage the season. The team continued its mixed results, finishing 4th for the second year in succession, despite beating champions North Geelong on the last match day. The following three seasons saw successive 6th-placed finishes, followed by an 8th-placed finish in 2013.

Following the implementation of the National Premier Leagues Victoria, PAOK were "promoted" to State League 1 North-West, essentially the same tier they had competed in the year prior as the Victorian Premier League had been split into two divisions. In 2014, the Phoenix finished in 11th place. The following season was better for the club as they finished in 7th place.

In 2017 Altona East finished in bottom place in the State League 1 North-West competition, enduring relegation to State 2 North-West for 2018, where they would finish in 8th place.

Colours 
Altona East adopt the Black and White stripes of Greek side PAOK FC for their home kit and for their crest.

Honours
Victorian Premier League Finalists 2001, 2002
Victorian State League Division 1 Champions 1998
Victorian State League Division 2 Champions 1997
Victorian State League Division 3 Champions 1994
Victorian State League Division 4 Champions 1993, Reserve Champions 1993
Victorian Provisional League Division 1 Champions 1992
Victorian Provisional League Division 2 Champions 1989
Hellenic Cup Champions 1992, 2004, 2013

Individual honours
Victorian Premier League Coach of the Year
2000 – Peter Ollerton

Records
Best Result at Home: 14–0 vs Melton Reds at Paisley Park Soccer Complex 10 September 1998
Best Result Away: 11–0 vs Doveton at Warratah Reserve 16 April 1994
Worst Result at Home: 0–4 vs Lalor SC on 30 May 1992, 0–4 vs Fawkner Blues on 30 April 2000 and 1–5 vs Williamstown SC on 27 August 2011 at Paisley Park Soccer Complex
Worst Result Away: 1–10 vs Hoppers Crossing SC at Grange Reserve 27 July 2019
Longest Winning Streak: 7 games – 18 July 1992 – 12 September 1992
Longest Losing Streak: 5 games – 5 April 2003 – 18 May 2003
Longest Unbeaten Streak: 23 games – 2 April 1994 – 17 September 1994

Top club goal-scorers
2018 - 
2017 - A Giannopoulos, E Benjamin, L Francis 2
2016 - 
2015 - Craige Tomkins 4
2014 - 
2013 – PJ Galea 6
2012 – PJ Galea 5
2011 – Bozidar Lojanica 12
2010 – Bozidar Lojanica and Benjamin Stafrace 6
2009 – Steven Iosifidis 6
2008 – Bozidar Lojanica 13
2007 – Marco Tolli 11
2006 – Taxiarhis Apostolikas 5
2005 – Taxiarhis Apostolikas 13
2004 – Danny Gnjidić 13
2003 – Nikolaos Papadopoulos and Steve Bartol 4
2002 – Daniel Genovesi 7
2001 – Nick Papadopoulos 7
2000 – Daniel Genovesi 8
1999 – George Angelos 11
1998 – Peter Kakos 26
1997 – George Angelos 14
1996 – Arthur Davis 12
1995 – Harry Timotheou 12
1994 – George Angelos 19
1993 – Nick Tsaltas 24

Current squad
 Misko Ceh 
 Dale Thompson
 Luke Cable 
 John Limperis 
 Harry Latrou
Peter Koufidis
Josh Kelic
Taylor Hughes
Dennis Koutroulis
Francesco Favata
Alessandro Verratti
Oner Kucuk

Former coaches
1997–1998: Takis Svigos
1999–2000: Peter Ollerton
2001–2003: Chris Taylor
2003 (Rnd 9): Peter Ollerton
2003 (Rnd 18): Giovanni De Amicis
2004: Charlie Egan
2005–2006: Takis Svigos
2006 (Rnd 10): Giovanni De Amicis
2007–2009: Dominic Barba
2009 (Rnd 15)-2010: Zoran Trajcevski
2010 (Rnd 15)-2011: Paul Donnelly

Rivalries
Altona East's rivals Altona Magic, Altona City SC, Yarraville Glory, Williamstown and Preston Lions.

Head-to-Head: Altona Magic
 Games: 10
 Phoenix wins: 5
 Magic wins: 4
 Draws: 1
 Phoenix goals: 11
 Magic goals: 8

Head-to-Head: Preston Lions
 Games: 13
 Phoenix wins: 5
 Preston wins: 8
 Draws: 0
 Phoenix goals: 14
 Preston goals: 18

Head-to-Head: Altona City
 Games: 17
 Phoenix wins: 12
 City wins: 3
 Draws: 2
 Phoenix goals: 37
 City goals: 16

Head-to-Head: Yarraville Glory
 Games: 6
 Phoenix wins: 3
 Glory wins: 2
 Draws: 1
 Phoenix goals: 5
 Glory goals: 3

Head-to-Head: Williamstown SC
 Games: 16
 Phoenix wins: 8
 Willi wins: 4
 Draws: 4
 Phoenix goals: 29
 Willi goals: 17

References

External links
OzFootball Altona East Phoenix Page
Football Federation Victoria Official website
Altona East Phoenix Football Club OFFICIAL Website

Association football clubs established in 1979
Greek-Australian culture in Melbourne
Soccer clubs in Melbourne
1979 establishments in Australia
Diaspora sports clubs in Australia
Sport in the City of Hobsons Bay